The Director of Naval Construction (DNC)  also known as the Department of the Director of Naval Construction and Directorate of Naval Construction and originally known as the Chief Constructor of the Navy was a senior principal civil officer responsible to the Board of Admiralty for the design and construction of the warships of the Royal Navy. From 1883 onwards he was also head of the Royal Corps of Naval Constructors, the naval architects who staffed his department from 1860 to 1966. The (D.N.C.'s) modern equivalent is Director Ships in the Defence Equipment and Support organisation of the Ministry of Defence.

History
The post evolved from the office of the Assistant Surveyor of the Navy (1832–1859) In 1860 the Assistant Surveyor was renamed Chief Constructor the post lasted until 1875 when it was renamed to the Director of Naval Construction. The chief constructor was originally head of the Royal Corps of Naval Constructors and members of the corps were responsible for the designing and building of warships, whether they were built in the Royal Dockyards (such as Chatham) or contracted out to private industry (such as Armstrong Whitworth). The Director was a naval architect as well as a manager. Work in the dockyards was covered to some extent by the two posts of Director of Naval Construction and the separately held Director of Dockyards. The latter's officers were responsible for checking that work contracted out by the former was being undertaken correctly. In designing warships the Director of Naval Construction had to work with the Department of the Engineer-in-Chief, another Admiralty post, which existed from 1847 to 1889. In 1958 following restructuring within the Admiralty this department as a wholly independent function ceased and it became a sub-division within a new larger ship department under the control of a Director-General, Ships until 1964 when the Admiralty department was abolished and replaced by a new Ministry of Defence. The Engineer-in-Chief post arose after the adoption of steam engines for propulsion. The French Navy had a similar post, Directeur des Construction Navales.

Post holders
Included:
Chief Constructors
Isaac Watts (1860–1863)
Sir Edward James Reed (1863–1870)
Sir Nathaniel Barnaby (1870–1875)
Directors of Naval Construction
Sir Nathaniel Barnaby (1875–1885)
Sir William Henry White (1885–1902)
Sir Philip Watts (1902–1912)
Sir Eustace Tennyson d'Eyncourt (1912–1924)
Sir William Berry (1924–1930)
Sir Arthur Johns (1930–1936)
Sir Stanley V. Goodall, KCB, OBE, RCNC (1936–1944)
Sir Charles S. Lillicrap (1944–1951)
Sir Victor Shepheard (1951–1958)

Department structure
As of April 1915:
Director of Naval Construction
Assistant Director of Naval Construction
Superintendent of Construction Accounts and Contract Work
Superintendent of Admiralty Experiment Works
Chief Constructor
Curator of Drawings
Examiner of Constructing Accounts
Inspecting Officer of Smiths Works
Superintending Electrical Engineer

As of October 1916:
Director of Naval Construction
Assistant Director of Naval Construction 
Superintendent of Construction Accounts and Contract Work
Senior Constructive Officer 
Chief Constructor
Superintending Electrical Engineer 
Inspecting Officer of Smiths' Work

As of April 1917:
Director of Naval Construction
Deputy Director of Naval Construction
Assistant Director of Naval Construction 
Superintendent of Construction Accounts and Contract Work 
Superintendent of Admiralty Experiment Works
Chief Constructor
Superintending Electrical Engineer
Examiner of Electrical Accounts
Curator of Drawings
Inspecting Officer of Smiths' Work

As of November 1918:
Director of Naval Construction
Deputy Director of Naval Construction
Assistant Director of Naval Construction 
Superintendent of Admiralty Experiment Works
Chief Constructor
Inspecting Officer of Smiths' Work
Inspecting Officer of Ship Fitting Work

Departments under the office
 Naval Construction Research Establishment, (NCRE), (1943–58)
 Admiralty Experimental Works Haslar
 Office of the Assistant Director Naval Construction
 Office of the Deputy Director Naval Construction
 Royal Corps of Naval Constructors
 Superintendent of Construction Accounts and Contract Work

Timeline
 Board of Admiralty, Surveyor of the Navy, Assistant Surveyor of the Navy, 1832–1859
 Board of Admiralty, Controller of the Navy, Chief Constructor, 1860–1875
 Board of Admiralty, Director of Naval Construction, 1875–1958
 Board of Admiralty, Director-General, Ship Department, Director Naval Construction Division, 1959–1964

See also
Admiralty administration

References

External links
Naval History

Admiralty during World War II
British naval architects
N